Felmersham is a small village and civil parish in the Borough of Bedford in Bedfordshire, England, on the River Great Ouse, about  north west of Bedford.  As a civil parish, it includes the hamlet of Radwell, and is sometimes known as Felmersham with Radwell, and has a population of about 800, and is circumscribed by the Great Ouse on the north, east and south. Other nearby places are Sharnbrook, Odell, Pavenham and Milton Ernest. 
Felmersham with Radwell was recorded in the Domesday Book of 1086 as a parish within the Hundred of Willey. John de Burnham, later Lord High Treasurer of Ireland, was parish priest here in the 1330s.

The Church of St Mary is located in the village.

The village gave its name to HMS Felmersham, a Ham class minesweeper.

Felmersham has no shop or Post Office but does have one public house, The Sun. Two previous pubs closed in the 1990s; The Plough in 1991 and The Six Ringers in 1995.

Felmersham supports a primary school. In 2017, Pinchmill Lower School changed to Pinchmill Primary School when the local education system changed from three tier to two tier. The school caters for children aged 5–11 (previous to 2017 it was 5–9).  After leaving, most children move on to  Sharnbrook Academy. The school building was opened in 1974 and took its name from the Pinchmill Islands in Sharnbrook.

References

External links

Felmersham and Radwell
Felmersham Village
Pinchmill Lower School website

 
Villages in Bedfordshire
Civil parishes in Bedfordshire
Borough of Bedford